Jo Sung-hwan (born 16 October 1970, in South Korea) is a manager of Jeju United. He played at Jeju United (then known as Yukong Elephants and Bucheon SK) and Jeonbuk Hyundai Motors. He was appointed manager of Jeju United on 12 December 2014.

Managing career
 Jeju United FC 2015–present

References

External links

Jeju United FC managers
Ajou University alumni
1970 births
Living people
South Korean footballers
Association football defenders
Incheon United FC managers
South Korean football managers